A400 may refer to:

 A400 road (London)
 Airbus A400M Atlas, a military aircraft
 Canon Powershot A400, a Canon PowerShot A camera model